XHKT-FM is a radio station in Tecate, Baja California. It broadcasts on 88.5 FM with a regional Mexican format as "La Super KT".

History
XEKT came to air on September 13, 1954. It was owned by Francisco Acuña Félix and broadcast on 1380 kHz with 250 watts during the day and 150 watts at night. In 1964, XEKT was sold to Martín Herrera Robles. After he died, XEKT was transferred to his widow, Hortensia Vázquez Vda. de Herrera, in 1977. Radio Cuchuma bought XEKT in 1980.

In the 1990s, XEKT moved from 1380 to 1390 kHz in order to raise power to 5,000 watts during the day.

It migrated to FM in 2011. XEKT-AM on 1390 kHz was shut down for good in 2016.

References

Radio stations in Baja California
Mass media in Tecate
Radio stations established in 1954